Antoinette Robain (born 7 December 1956 in Paris) is a French architect. In 2004, she won the Prix de l'Équerre d'Argent with Claire Guieysse for the Centre National de la Danse de Pantin.

References

External links 
 http://www.pss-archi.eu/architecte/932/

1956 births
Living people
French women architects